Lufthansa Consulting is an international aviation consultancy for airlines, airports and related industries. The company is an independent subsidiary of the Lufthansa Group and provides services to the air transportation industry worldwide. The headquarters are situated at the Frankfurt Airport Center (FAC) in Frankfurt, and there are branch offices in Moscow and Rio de Janeiro. Around 100 employees from 18 countries work on projects throughout the world. The German consultancy assists aviation-specific client groups including airlines, airports  and aviation authorities as well as related industries such as ground handling companies, cargo terminal operators, aircraft manufacturers and financial institutions. Safety issues and sustainable aviation have gained increasing importance for the aviation industry as particularly airlines, and airports strive to comply with new security and environmental regulations.

History
Lufthansa Consulting GmbH was founded in 1998 as a subsidiary of Lufthansa. This independent service area was capable of reacting more flexibly to market demand. The intention was for Lufthansa Consulting to offer services to the transportation industry in general. Based on this decision a cooperation with a railway company and other transportation and aviation companies were planned.
In the 1990s with an increased market orientation the consulting portfolio was extended to include Air Traffic Control and infrastructure development services. The rising demand for services that included implementation caused a shift in the product development focus. Lufthansa Consulting established aviation restructuring and privatization services. During this period international projects included the privatization of Carrasco International Airport in Uruguay and the turnaround of Mexicana de Aviación in Mexico and the restructuring of Philippine Airlines.
From 2000 Lufthansa Consulting focused on management consultancy services for the aviation industry. Notable projects have included the restructuring of Air Madagascar, the development of Ouagadougou International Airport, flight operations and safety improvements at Petrobras and upgrading operational processes for Kenya Airways. As the market has become more competitive businesses have been finding it necessary to adopt new strategies and tools to remain viable.

In 2012 Dr Andreas Jahnke took over the position as Managing Director of Lufthansa Consulting. New management structures and reorganized responsibilities were established. The company focuses primarily on regional markets in Europe, Russia, CIS, Middle East, Asia, Africa and South America. Solution Groups focuses on operations, commercial, finance and "transformation topics". The new Inter-Branch services is active in non-aviation industries like transport and logistics companies, railways and bus line operators.

Recent projects have included the restructuring of Saudia, the optimization of
pricing and revenue management processes at EgyptAir and network planning for Estonian Air. An expansion plan for Air Astana and a master plan concept for the strategic development for Almaty International Airport were established. More projects have included a pricing and revenue check-up at SriLankan Airlines, the design of a cargo growth strategy for jetBlue and the development of an operations assessment to increase efficiency and productivity at Air Mauritius.

Cooperations
ACI Airports Council International

AFRAA African Airlines Association https://web.archive.org/web/20090815183931/http://www.afraa.org/partner-list.htm

AACO Arab Air Carriers Organization https://web.archive.org/web/20101224232133/http://www.aaco.org/partners.asp

Corporate affairs
In August 2014 it moved into its new headquarters at the Frankfurt Airport Center (FAC) at Frankfurt Airport, near Terminal 1. Previously it had offices in Cologne and Frankfurt, with Cologne having the headquarters.

References

Lufthansa
Companies based in Frankfurt
Companies based in Cologne